The discography of Oingo Boingo, an American new wave band, consists of eight studio albums, two live albums, five compilation albums, two extended plays, one soundtrack, seventeen singles, ten music videos, and a list of soundtrack appearances.

Albums

Studio albums

1  Released as a Danny Elfman solo album but often retrospectively attributed to Oingo Boingo
2  Released as "Boingo"

Live albums

Compilations

Soundtracks

Tribute albums

Extended plays

Singles

1  As "The Mystic Knights of the Oingo Boingo"
2  As Danny Elfman
3  As Boingo

Music videos

Other appearances
This section is intended to be a compendium of the many tracks that Oingo Boingo has recorded for TV and film soundtracks, as well as various artists compilation albums. It also includes previously released songs that have been included in TV, film and other media.

References

Discographies of American artists
Rock music group discographies
Pop music group discographies
New wave discographies